Ameeta (born as Qamar Sultana) is an Indian actress. She appeared in Bollywood films such as Tumsa Nahin Dekha, Mere Mehboob and Goonj Uthi Shehnai.

Career

Beginning
A fan of Madhubala, Ameeta was enacting her idol's sword fight from Baadal (1951) when she caught the eye of Lekhraj Bhakhri, who signed her for his movie Thokar starring Shammi Kapoor. This was her debut film in a side role where she was credited as Jayjaywanti. Ameeta's debut movie as heroine was a 1953 release, Shri Chaitanya Mahaprabhu (1954), directed by Vijay Bhatt. The screen name Ameeta made its appearance in this movie. The film failed, but Ameeta kept on working in films like Amar Kirtan, Badal Aur Bijli, Baaghi Sardar and Indrasabha.

Her career took a positive turn in 1956 when she starred with her idol Madhubala in the box office hit Shirin Farhad. She was then chosen for lead roles in Abhimaan and Zamana and Hum Sab Chor Hain (1956) along with Shammi Kapoor and Nalini Jaywant.

Breakthrough
The turning point in Ameeta's career though came when she became the protégé of Filmistan Studios' owner Tolaram Jalan, who produced Tumsa Nahin Dekha (1957) opposite Shammi kapoor, as a vehicle for promoting Ameeta as a new star. Great care was taken with her make-up, wardrobe and lighting, to present her in the most flattering and advantageous way possible. Furthermore, much of the film's extensive publicity also centred on the actress. The film was a big success but Ameeta's thunder was stolen by the until then struggling Shammi Kapoor. This got her the female lead of Goonj Uthi Shehnai, a role originally intended for Asha Parekh, with whom she had acted earlier in Shri Chaitanya Mahaprabhu (1954). The film starred a then up-and-coming Rajendra Kumar and an exceptional music score went on to become one of the top-grossing films of 1959. Here despite a mature and sensitive performance, Ameeta was overlooked and Kumar was given credit for the film's emphatic success.

Later work
Although she kickstarted the careers of Shammi Kapoor and Rajendra Kumar with these hits, Ameeta could never capitalize on them and stardom never materialized.

Further roles in multi-star films like Rakhi (1962) and the blockbuster Mere Mehboob (1963) did not help her career graph, even though she was nominated for a Filmfare award for the latter as Best Supporting Actress, and she now dropped to playing lead grade-B movies which though successful at the box office did not do much for her star status. Her romance opposite Kishore Kumar in Hum Sab Ustad Hai in 1965 was her next role. By 1965 she was playing negative and villainous characters in films like Rishte Naate (1965), and Aasra (1966). She was seen in supporting roles to fledgling starlets Rajshree and Babita, in films like Around the World (1967) and Haseena Maan Jayegi (1968). After filming Haseena Maan Jayegi (1968), a disillusioned Ameeta left the film industry as she was not getting leading roles and settled into matrimony.

Personal life
After she retired from the film world she married and had a daughter, Sabia (otherwise Sabeeha). Sabia tried her hand in Bollywood as a lead actress in Anokha Rishta (1986) and Khiladi (1992) and 100 Days (1991) which were big hits of respective years, but her career never took off. She appeared in Qayamat Ki Raat (1992), before she too disappeared from the Hindi movie scene.

Awards
Ameeta was nominated for a Filmfare Award as Best Supporting Actress for Mere Mehboob (1962) but lost out to Shashikala for Gumrah (1963).  She came out of seclusion only once to accept the Lifetime Achievement Award by the Cine & TV Artistes Association on 20 November 2005 and then disappeared again.

Filmography

References

External links
 

Living people
Actresses in Hindi cinema
20th-century Indian actresses
Year of birth missing (living people)